Benjamin Hart (born 4 May 1977) is a New Zealand former cricketer. He played one first-class match for Otago in 1997/98.

See also
 List of Otago representative cricketers

References

External links
 

1977 births
Living people
New Zealand cricketers
Otago cricketers
Cricketers from Hamilton, New Zealand